
Laguna Blanca is a salt lake in an endorheic basin, in the Sur Lípez Province of the Potosí Department, Bolivia. It is near the Licancabur volcano.

Geography

Its surface area is 10.9 km².

The characteristic white colour of the water, that gave the lake its name, is caused by the high amount of minerals suspended in it.

Only a narrow corridor separates Laguna Blanca from the smaller Laguna Verde. Both are within the Eduardo Avaroa Andean Fauna National Reserve

See also 
Laguna Verde (Bolivia) — a salt lake also in Eduardo Avaroa Andean Fauna National Reserve.
Altiplano region
Licancabur volcano
Mount Nelly

External links

Lakes of Potosí Department
Endorheic lakes of South America